The Battle of Bayou Fourche (September 10, 1863) saw Union forces under the overall command of Frederick Steele clash with Confederate forces led by Sterling Price near Little Rock, Arkansas. The only fighting occurred when Steele's cavalry commanded by John W. Davidson crossed to the south side of the Arkansas River and compelled the Confederate cavalry under John S. Marmaduke to abandon its defensive position behind Bayou Fourche. Price's outnumbered forces evacuated Little Rock and withdrew south to Arkadelphia. The Union occupation of Little Rock was the final action in a campaign that started on August 18 when Steele's troops marched west from DeValls Bluff.

Abbreviations used

Military rank

 Maj. Gen. = Major General
 Brig. Gen. = Brigadier General
 Col. = Colonel
 Lieut. Col. = Lieutenant Colonel
 Maj. = Major
 Capt. = Captain
 1st Lieut. = First Lieutenant

Other

 (k) = killed in action
 (w) = wounded
 (c) = captured

Artillery

 10lb PR   = 10-pounder Parrott rifle
 12lb How  = M1841 12-pounder howitzer
 14lb JR   = 14-pounder James rifle
 3-in OR   = 3-inch Ordnance rifle
 6lb Gun   = M1841 6-pounder field gun
 6lb Rifle = M1841 6-pounder field gun (rifled)
 Mtn How   = M1841 mountain howitzer

Union forces
Union Army: Maj. Gen. Frederick Steele
Present aggregate (Aug. 18, 1863): 13,000, 57 guns (18 guns with Davidson), 14,500 including True's brigade. 
Present for duty (Sept. 10, 1863): 10,477
Present aggregate (Aug. 18, 1863): 13,207, 49 guns
Present for duty (Aug. 18, 1863): 4,652 cavalry, 4,493 infantry, 288 artillery, 9,433 total
Casualties: 18 killed, 118 wounded, 1 missing
Cavalry Escort: 
Company D, 3rd Illinois Cavalry Regiment, 1st Lieut. James K. McLean
Kane County, Illinois Cavalry, 1st Lieut. Eben C. Litherland

Confederate forces
Confederate Army: Maj. Gen. Sterling Price
On July 23, 1863, the department commander Lieut. Gen. Theophilus H. Holmes became ill and was superseded by Price.  
On September 6, 1863, Brig. Gen. Marmaduke mortally wounded Brig. Gen. Walker in a duel. Col. Dobbins assumed command of Walker's division. 
Marmaduke placed Dobbins under arrest on September 10 for disobedience of orders and command devolved upon Col. Newton. Price later suspended Dobbins's arrest.
Present for duty: 7,749. About 6,500 were north of the Arkansas River and 1,250 south of the river.
Aggregate present (September): 10,665, 32 guns. Present for duty: 8,532.
Casualties: 12 killed, 34 wounded, 18 missing.

See also
List of orders of battle

Notes
Footnotes

Citations

References

American Civil War orders of battle
Battle of Bayou Fourche